Vanitha Vasu is an Indian actress who has appeared in many Kannada films. She is best known for her roles in Kadina Benki (1988), Aaganthuka, Tarka (1989), Nagamandala and Uthkarsha (1990). Vanitha Vasu was born in Bangalore and completed her education in MES College. She has acted in films and television series and starred opposite all the stalwarts of Kannada film industry.

Filmography

References

External links
 

Indian film actresses
Actresses in Kannada cinema
Year of birth missing (living people)
Living people
Place of birth missing (living people)
20th-century Indian actresses